Changes to the Mosaic Law throughout history are changes made by Jews to the Law of Moses in the course of the history of Judaism.

Uttering the name of God
In the early days of Israel, uttering Yahweh, the name of God, was common practice. After the destruction of the First Temple during the Siege of Jerusalem (587 BC), the utterance of God's name was made illegal, being considered the capital crime of blasphemy.

Enslavement of Jews
Slavery is codified in numerous verses in the Torah. After the destruction of the First Temple, the prophets of Israel abolished the enslavement of Israelites by Israelites. During the Second Temple period, the prophet Nehemiah rebuked the wealthy Jews for continuing to enslave poor Jews.

Offerings in the Temple
So long as the Temple stood, offering certain korban to God was obligatory. After the destruction of the Second Temple during the Siege of Jerusalem (70 CE), korban was replaced with works of mercy.

References

Mosaic Law
Mosaic Law
Mosaic Law
Mosaic Law
Judaism and capital punishment
Jewish law